The Faculty of Medical Sciences of the National University of Rosario (Facultad de Ciencias Médicas in Spanish) is located in the city of Rosario, Argentina, in the central Santa Fe Avenue with France Avenue, segmenting the latter into two parts, form a set of four interlocking blocks of streets and interior corridors between different departments where there is also the Centennial Provincial Hospital.

History 

On the occasion of celebrating the centenary of the country, April 18, 1910, Cornelio Casablanca proposes the construction of Centennial Hospital and a School of Medical Education in the city of Rosario, putting on May 24, 1910 the foundation stone on France Avenue which begin the following year the works.

After the construction, October 17, 1919 is proclaimed the law creating the National University of the Littoral officer under whose authority until 1968 this faculty.

On April 9, hospital Vice Chairman Casiano Casas handed over the facilities, on April 13, 1920 registration begins, on 29 May performs a symbolic act of opening and the June 1, 1920 at 8:00 am Professor of Embryology and Histology Dr. Thomas Cerruti dictates first class their subject in his classroom.

The great development in the city of Rosario of the National University of the Littoral soon showed the need to create the National University of Rosario, an initiative that took shape in 1968, using the academic structure that had the National University of the Littoral.

With the creation of the National University of Rosario, was born then the Faculty of Medical Sciences, one of the cornerstones in the realization of the dream of giving Rosario his own university.

On May 16, 1969 began the protests known as "Rosariazo" against repressive acts occurred in the Corrientes Province carried out by the government dictatorship of Juan Carlos Onganía.

Career Grade
Medicine
Speech and language pathology
Nursing

See also
National University of Rosario
Rosario
Rosariazo

External links 

Rosario
Buildings and structures in Rosario, Santa Fe
National University of Rosario